Sierra Leone Commercial Bank (SLCB) is a commercial bank in Sierra Leone. It is one of the commercial banks licensed by the Bank of Sierra Leone,  the country's central bank and national banking regulator.

Overview
SLCB was founded in 1973. It serves large corporations, small and medium enterprises, and individual customers. It is operated and managed by indigenous Sierra Leoneans.

Ownership
The stock of the bank is 100 percent owned by the Government of Sierra Leone.

Branch network
SLCB maintains its headquarters in Freetown, the capital, and has branches in Freetown, Bo, Kenema, Makeni, Koidu, Cline Town, Mobimbi, Njala, and Waterloo.

See also

Banking in Sierra Leone
List of banks in Sierra Leone 
List of banks in Africa

References

Banks of Sierra Leone
Companies based in Freetown
Banks established in 1973
1973 establishments in Sierra Leone